A team's Grand Slam in the Philippine Basketball Association (PBA) is winning all three conference championships (tournaments) in a single season, i.e., a treble in the British sports sense. As of 2020, this has been accomplished five times by four teams and four coaches since the league's inception in 1975.

In the 1970s, 1980s, and 1990s, at least one team swept the championships in one season. The decade 2000–2009 had no Grand Slam winner because of adjustments to the league calendar in 2004, in which the start of the season was moved from January to October and the number of conferences per season was reduced from three to two. The three-conference season format was reinstated in the 2010–11 season.

Grand Slam winners

1976 Crispa Redmanizers

In the league's second season, the Crispa Redmanizers became the first team to win all of the conference championships in a single season. Before the start of the 1976 season, they had won the All-Philippine Championship, the third conference of the PBA's maiden season. The Redmanizers won all of the 1976 season conferencesthe All-Filipino (reclassified as the First Conference in 2010), the Open (reclassified as the Second Conference), and the All-Philippine Championshipwith an overall season record of 47–15. All of their championships were won against the Toyota Comets, who have been the Crispa Redmanizers' rivals since both teams played in MICAA. The Crispa Redmanizers' team was composed of future Hall of Famers Bogs Adornado, Atoy Co, Abet Guidaben, and Philip Cezar, and was coached by Baby Dalupan.

1983 Crispa Redmanizers

Crispa Redmanizers achieved the Grand Slam again in the 1983 season. The team still comprised many of the same players as the 1976 Grand Slam team, but they were now coached by former U/Tex Wranglers tactician Tommy Manotoc. Crispa began the season by winning 12 consecutive games in the All-Filipino Conference, losing only their first game to Toyota in the start of the group stage. They finished the group stage with a 7–1 record, then won all of their playoff games, including their best-of-five series against Gilbey's Gin Tonics. The team's winning streak continued into the next conference, the Reinforced Filipino Conference, as Crispa won their first nine games in the group stage and ended their streak with 21 wins. Also this conference, they hired former Portland Trail Blazer player Billy Ray Bates as their import. Crispa Redmanizers have won the conference championship against former Redmanizer Bogs Adornado and the Great Taste Coffee Makers by three games to two.

In the Open Conference, the final conference of the season, the Redmanizers again hired Bates as their import. They entered the finals against Great Taste. The Redmanizers again defeated the Coffee Makers in their best-of-five finals series. Bates won Best Import of the Conference awards for the Reinforced Filipino and Open Conferences. Abet Guidaben won the Most Valuable Player award at the end of the season.

1989 San Miguel Beermen

The San Miguel Beermen won the 1988 PBA Reinforced Conference championship before winning the 1989 Grand Slam. The San Miguel team comprised the core of the Northern Consolidated Cement team, which represented the Philippines in international tournaments. The NCC team also captured the 1985 PBA Reinforced Conference championship as a guest team. The players formerly of the NCC team were Hector Calma, Yves Dignadice, Samboy Lim, and Elmer Reyes. The team was coached by Norman Black, who twice won the best importee award. The San Miguel Beermen also acquired former Purefoods Hotdogs center and playing coach Ramon Fernandez, controversially trading him for Abet Guidaben with the Hotdogs.

With import Michael Phelps, San Miguel won the Open Conferencethe first conference championship of the seasonagainst Formula Shell Zoom Masters led by Bobby Parks. The Beermen struggled in the group stage of the All-Filipino Conference but went into the final against Purefoods Hotdogs and won the championship series in six games. In the final conference of the season, the Reinforced Conference, the Beermen performed poorly in the group stage and won most of their games in the semifinal round. They advanced to the finals against sister team Añejo Rum 65ers. They have won their best-of-seven series against the 65ers in five games.

1996 Alaska Milkmen

The Alaska Milkmen won the Governors' Cup, the championship of the third conference of the 1995 season. The team comprised Johnny Abarrientos, Jojo Lastimosa, Bong Hawkins, and Jeffrey Cariaso. They were coached by Tim Cone, who was the first coach to implement the Triangle Offense system in the PBA.

In the first conference of the 1996 season, the All-Filipino Cup, the Milkmen played the Purefoods TJ Hotdogs in the best-of-seven finals. In Game 5 of the championship series, Purefoods forced the game into overtime and held a one-point lead against Alaska, 92–91, with 10.3 seconds remaining. In the next play, Alaska was inbounding from their baseline behind the basket. Jeffrey Cariaso caught the ball in an alley-oop attempt but was fouled by Bong Ravena while trying to block the shot with 0.6 seconds left. Cariaso sank both of his free throws and gave Alaska the lead, 93–92. With no timeouts left, the TJ Hotdogs threw a desperate attempt from the opposite side of their basket and missed, giving the Milkmen the All-Filipino championship.

In the second conference, the Commissioner's Cup, the Milkmen hired Derrick Hamilton as their import for the tournament. After the league found out about Hamilton's marijuana use, the Milkmen hired their resident import Sean Chambers to replace Hamilton. The Milkmen played against the Formula Shell Zoom Masters in the finals and won the championship in seven games. In the third and final conference of the season, the Governors' Cup, the Milkmen played Barangay Ginebra San Miguel. The Milkmen won their series against the Gin Kings in five games. Johnny Abarrientos won the MVP award at the end of the season.

2013–14 San Mig Super Coffee Mixers

In 2011, the former Alaska coach Tim Cone took over the coaching duties of the B-Meg Llamados teamlater renamed the San Mig Super Coffee Mixers. The team's core comprised twice-league MVP James Yap, Marc Pingris, and PJ Simon.

In the first conference of the 2013–14 season, the Philippine Cup, the Coffee Mixers performed poorly in their first games of the tournament and were ranked in fifth place at the end of the group stage. They faced arch-rivals Barangay Ginebra San Miguel in the semifinals and won their series in seven games. They beat the Rain or Shine Elasto Painters in the finals and won the championship by four games to two.

In the Commissioner's Cup, the Coffee Mixers hired James Mays as their reinforcement for the tournament. Still struggling in the regular conference, the Coffee Mixers finished in sixth place with a 4–5 record. The team played the defending champions Alaska Milkmen in a best-of-three quarterfinal series. Alaska Milkmen won the first game 86–77, and were on verge of eliminating the Coffee Mixers. The Coffee Mixers won the next two games to advance to the semifinal round against Air21 Express, an unexpected semifinalist who had eliminated the second-seeded San Miguel Beermen, who had a twice-to-beat advantage. Air21 Express, led by Asi Taulava, won the first game against the Mixers, 103–100. The Coffee Mixers won the next two games; they took the series lead and were one win away from a place in the finals. Air21 Express scored 94 points in Game 4 and forced a rubber match. Game 5 was won by the Coffee Mixers 99–83. In the finals, they faced the Talk 'N Text Tropang Texters, who had a 13–0 record before the start of their championship series. The Coffee Mixers won the first game of the series. Talk 'N Text won Game 2 of the finals but the Coffee Mixers won the next two games and their third consecutive championship.

In the Governors' Cup, the Coffee Mixers hired their resident import Marqus Blakely as their reinforcement for the tournament. The team finished the group stage with a 5–4 record and tied with Alaska, San Miguel, Barangay Ginebra, and Air21 in third place. Because of the quotient system imposed for tiebreakers in this conference, the Coffee Mixers were in fourth place, having the second-best quotient among the five teams. The Coffee Mixers defeated fifth-seeded San Miguel Beermen in the quarterfinals in one game (SMC had a twice-to-beat advantage), 97–90.  The Coffee Mixers advanced to the semifinal round, where they played  their Commissioner's Cup finals opponent the Talk 'N Text Tropang Texters. The Coffee Mixers won the first two games of their best-of-five series, giving them a lead to close the series and eliminate Talk 'N Text. However, the Tropang Texters won games 3 and 4, forcing a deciding Game 5. The rubber match was very close and no team led their opponent for more than seven points in the first three quarters. In the fourth quarter, the free-throw shooting problems and missed attempts in Talk 'N Text's paint allowed Coffee Mixers win the game and secure a place in the finals. They played their Philippine Cup opponents, Rain or Shine. The Coffee Mixers won the series and the Grand Slam after five games.

Failed Grand Slam bids
These teams won the first two conferences but were defeated in the last tournament: 
 1975 Toyota Tamaraws (lost to Crispa in the All-Philippine Championship finals)
 1977 Crispa Redmanizers (missed Finals berth in the Invitational Conference)
 1985 Great Taste Coffee Makers (missed Finals berth in the Reinforced Conference) 
 1986 Tanduay Rhum Masters (missed Finals berth in the Open Conference)
 1995 Sunkist Orange Juicers (missed Finals berth in the Governors' Cup)
 1998 Alaska Milkmen (missed Finals berth in the Governors' Cup)
 2010–11 Talk 'N Text Tropang Texters (lost to Petron in the Governors' Cup finals)
 2016–17 San Miguel Beermen (missed Finals berth in the Governors' Cup)
 2019 San Miguel Beermen (missed Finals berth in the Governors' Cup)

Consecutive champions
In other instances, a team won three or even four consecutive conferences in two different seasons. These teams were:
 1976–1977 Crispa Redmanizers (six straight championships: 1975 All-Philippine Championship, 1976 Grand Slam, 1977 All-Filipino Conference and 1977 Open Conference)
 1983–1984 Crispa Redmanizers (four straight championships: 1983 Grand Slam, 1984 First All-Filipino Conference)
 1984–1985 Great Taste Coffee Makers (four straight championships: 1984 Second All-Filipino Conference, 1984 Invitational Championship, 1985 Open Conference, 1985 All-Filipino Conference)
 1988–1989 San Miguel Beermen (four straight championships: 1988 PBA Reinforced Conference, 1989 Grand Slam)
 1995–1996 Alaska Milkmen (four straight championship: 1995 Governors' Cup and 1996 Grand Slam)
 1997–1998 Alaska Milkmen (three straight championships: 1997 Governors' Cup, 1998 All-Filipino Cup and 1998 PBA Commissioner's Cup)
 2000–2001 San Miguel Beermen (three straight championships: 2000 Commissioner's Cup, 2000 Governors' Cup, 2001 All-Filipino Cup)
 2013–2014 San Mig Super Coffee Mixers (four straight championships: 2013 Governors' Cup, 2013–14 Grand Slam)

Grand Slam during the two-conference era
From the 2004–05 season to 2009–10 season, the league adopted a two-conference format: an All-Filipino tournament named the PBA Philippine Cup and an import-laced tournament named the PBA Fiesta Conference. A Grand Slam could be attained during this period by winning both titles instead of the usual three. No team in the PBA won this version of the Grand Slam.

Other usage in the Philippines
The term "Grand Slam" has also come into local usage, in which a team/person wins at least three consecutive championships (see "three-peat"). In the defunct Philippine Basketball League (PBL), a Grand Slam could be won because the amateur league also has a three-conference format similar to that of the PBA. The Stag Pale Pilseners led by future Barangay Ginebra San Miguel players Marlou Aquino and Bal David won the PBL version of the Grand Slam in the league's 1995–96 season, coached by Alfrancis Chua the Stags dominated the said Season.

The Tanduay Rhum Masters also won the said feat in the PBL's 1997–98 Season, also coached by Alfrancis Chua, the lineup of the Rhum Masters for the said season are Eric Menk, Mark Telan and Chris Cantojos.

References

See also
Philippine Basketball Association Champions

Philippine Basketball Association lore
Basketball terminology